Yesterday Rules is the tenth album by the Berkeley, California punk rock band The Mr. T Experience (whose name is abbreviated on this release as MTX), released in 2004 by Lookout! Records. It was the band's first album to include bassist Bobby J, taking the position left vacant by Gabe Meline. It was also their first album to include second guitarist Ted Angel, making it the band's first release as a quartet since 1992's Milk Milk Lemonade.

Five of the album's songs were previously recorded and released by band leader Dr. Frank in 2003 on his solo EP Eight Little Songs.

Track listing

Performers
Dr. Frank - vocals, guitar
Ted Angel - guitar
Bobby J - bass
Jim "Jym" Pittman - drums

Album information
Produced by Kevin Army
Engineered by Kevin Army and Mark Keaton at Sharkbite Studios
Mastered by John Golden for John Golden Mastering
Design and layout by Christopher Applegren
Photography by Katy Zaug, Ruth Pittman, and others

References

The Mr. T Experience albums
2004 albums